Luiz Otávio Anacleto Leandro (born 14 September 1988), known as Luiz Otávio, is a Brazilian footballer who plays for Ceará as a central defender.

Club career
Born in Carmo, Rio de Janeiro, Luiz Otávio graduated from the youth academy of Botafogo and turned professional with Friburguense in 2008. In 2009, he joined local Angra dos Reis Esporte Clube, and initially spent loan at lower tier clubs - Madureira, Macaé before joining Série B club Icasa in 2013. On 28 May, he scored his first goal for the club in a 1−1 draw against América-RN.

After a short stint with Clube Atlético Linense, Luiz Otávio was loaned to Sampaio Corrêa on 8 April 2014. On 18 November, he scored his first goal for the club in a 2−0 victory against Santa Cruz Futebol Clube. In the 2016 season, he started in 32 matches with the club being relegated to the third tier.

On 7 December 2016, Luiz Otávio joined Ceará on loan for the 2017 season. He made a total of 44 appearances and scored thrice, with his club winning promotion to Série A.

On 13 December 2017, Luiz Otávio renewed his contract with Angra dos Reis until 2021, and was loaned back to Ceará. On 31 December 2018, his contract was extended until 2021, and the club bought 75% of his economic rights for a fee of R$ 1 million.

Club statistics

References

Honours
Ceará
 Copa do Nordeste: 2020

External links

1988 births
Living people
Sportspeople from Rio de Janeiro (state)
Brazilian footballers
Association football defenders
Campeonato Brasileiro Série A players
Campeonato Brasileiro Série B players
Campeonato Brasileiro Série C players
Campeonato Brasileiro Série D players
Friburguense Atlético Clube players
Madureira Esporte Clube players
Macaé Esporte Futebol Clube players
Associação Desportiva Recreativa e Cultural Icasa players
Clube Atlético Linense players
Sampaio Corrêa Futebol Clube players
Ceará Sporting Club players